Gratiana may refer to :

 Gratiana, Africa, a former Roman city and bishopric in Byzacena, now a Latin Catholic titular see
 Gratiana (beetle), a genus of tortoise beetles
 Gratiana, a fictional character in the 1629 James Shirley play The Wedding

See also 
 Gratian(us), the male equivalent in Latin
 Gratianopolis (disambiguation)